Aircraft Spruce & Specialty Co. is an American producer of aircraft parts and services including plans for homebuilt aircraft.

History
Aircraft Spruce Co. was founded in 1965 by Bob and Flo Irwin as a follow-on to founding Fullerton Air Parts. Initially the company sold only one product: aircraft grade spruce lumber for aircraft construction and restoration. Aircraft Spruce Co. added more products and adopted the name Aircraft Spruce & Specialty Co.

Jim Irwin, Bob and Flo's older son, managed kit programs such as the Vari-Eze in 1975 while still in college. In 1978 Jim acquired the company, and he became president in 1980. 

Aircraft Spruce was housed in Fullerton, California, from 1965 until 1997 in a historic Fullerton former citrus packing house. It then moved to a  facility in Corona, California. Aircraft Spruce East moved to a new  facility in Peachtree City, Georgia, in 2004. Aircraft Spruce Canada was opened in Toronto in 2006, and moved to the Brantford, Ontario Airport in 2008 with a new  facility coming online in 2016. In 2019, Aircraft Spruce opened two new facilities with Aircraft Spruce Midwest operating in a  facility in West Chicago, Illinois, and Aircraft Spruce Alaska in a  building in Wasilla, Alaska. 

Ron Alexander's Alexander Aeroplane Company was purchased and integrated into the company. The Aviation Book Company was purchased in late 2014.

Founder Bob Irwin died on 26 June 2015 at his home in Lake Havasu City, Arizona.

Aircraft kits and plans

Aircraft Spruce has the rights to sell kits and plans for a large selection of homebuilt aircraft.

References

External links

Homebuilt aircraft
Aircraft manufacturers of the United States
Manufacturing companies based in Greater Los Angeles
Manufacturing in Riverside County, California
Manufacturing companies established in 1965
1965 establishments in California